The Church of Saints Peter and Paul in Dobrić, near Šabac, is a Serbian Orthodox Church, built in 1827.

References

Serbian Orthodox church buildings in Serbia
19th-century Serbian Orthodox church buildings
1820s establishments in Serbia
Religious organizations established in 1827
Šabac
1827 establishments in the Ottoman Empire